Spatalistis droserantha is a species of moth of the family Tortricidae. It is found in India (Assam).

The wingspan is about 15 mm. The forewings are clear yellow, irregularly reticulated with pale ochreous-brownish, with numerous raised pale violet-metallic dots in the irregular transverse series. There are three or four larger blue-leaden dots beneath the costa anteriorly, as well as an incurved pale ochreous-brownish streak with several larger dots from the middle of the dorsum to costa about four-fifths. The hindwings are whitish-ochreous becoming whitish anteriorly.

References

Moths described in 1930
droserantha